The following is an alphabetical list of members of the United States House of Representatives from the state of West Virginia.  For chronological tables of members of both houses of the United States Congress from the state (through the present day), see United States congressional delegations from West Virginia.  The list of names should be complete (as of January 3, 2019).

Current members

Updated January 3, 2023. 
 : Carol Miller (R) (since 2019)
 : Alex Mooney (R) (since 2015)

List of members representing the state

See also

List of United States senators from West Virginia
United States congressional delegations from West Virginia
West Virginia's congressional districts

References

Sources 
 House of Representatives List of Members

West Virginia

United States rep